The Cat Laughs Comedy Festival is a comedy festival held over the first weekend in June each year in Kilkenny, County Kilkenny, Republic of Ireland. It was founded in 1994.

History 
Cat Laughs was envisioned in 1994 by Lynn Cahill who ran Bickerstaffe theatre company in Kilkenny. As a means to expand the companies programme, she considered with her business partner that Kilkenny was great for a festival. After originally planning a choral festival called "Cat Sings", her business partner Richard Cook suggested a comedy festival instead. For the first two editions, no Irish comedian closed the festival due to the audience preferring British comics. The first edition was sponsored by Smithwick's before being sponsored by Murphy's Irish Stout until 2015 when Smithwick's returned. It is traditionally held over the weekend of Pentecost. Each comedian is previewed at other shows by the festival directors before being invited to perform at Cat Laughs.

Several comedians throughout the British Isles attended including; Dara Ó Briain, Ed Byrne and Eddie Izzard. The festival became referred to by RTE as the "Best Little Comedy Festival in the world". The festival has also been used as a way to launch the careers of comedians from outside the British Isles in the United Kingdom and the Republic of Ireland.

A tradition developed over the years that as a part of the festival, the Irish comedians would play a football match against comedians from the rest of the world for the Cat Cup.

References

External links 
 Official Site
 Facebook Page

Comedy festivals in Ireland
Culture in County Kilkenny
Kilkenny (city)